Sphingopyxis indica is a Gram-negative, aerobic, non-spore-forming, rod-shaped and non-motile bacterium from the genus of Sphingopyxis.

References

Sphingomonadales
Bacteria described in 2013